State Route 283 (SR 283) is a  route that serves as a connection between US 411 in the central business district of Centre and US 411 on the eastern edge of the town in Cherokee County.

Route description
SR 283 begins at its intersection with US 411 in the central business district of Centre. From this point, the route travels in a northeasterly direction as Cedar Bluff Road where it meets US 411 Truck and SR 68 and turns in an easterly direction. SR 283 then briefly travels to the east before turning to the southeast en route to its eastern terminus at US 411 in eastern Centre.

Major intersections

References

External links

283
Transportation in Cherokee County, Alabama